Mackenzie Bay is a natural inlet in northern Canada, named for the explorer Sir Alexander Mackenzie. It is an arm of the Beaufort Sea. To the west is Herschel Island and the Yukon mainland. To the east is Richards Island, NW Territories.

References

Bodies of water of Yukon
Inlets of Canada